The 1946 Nevada gubernatorial election was held on November 5, 1946. Incumbent Democrat Vail Pittman defeated Republican nominee Melvin E. Jepson with 57.42% of the vote.

Primary elections
Primary elections were held on September 3, 1946.

Democratic primary

Candidates
Vail Pittman, incumbent Governor
Simon W. Conwell

Results

Republican primary

Candidates
Melvin E. Jepson, Washoe County District Attorney
Aaron V. Tallman, State Senator

Results

General election

Candidates
Vail M. Pittman, Democratic
Melvin E. Jepson, Republican

Results

References

1946
Nevada
Gubernatorial
November 1946 events in the United States